The year 1924 in architecture involved some significant architectural events and new buildings.

Events
 May – Royal Fine Art Commission appointed to advise the government of the United Kingdom on matters concerning the built environment.
 Eileen Gray and Jean Badovici begin work on their vacation home E-1027 at Roquebrune-Cap-Martin in the south of France

Buildings and structures

Buildings completed
 The Chilehaus in Hamburg, Germany, designed by Johann Friedrich Höger.
 Rietveld Schröder House in Utrecht, Netherlands, designed by Gerrit Rietveld.
 Copenhagen Police Headquarters in Denmark, designed by Hack Kampmann (died 1920).
 Midland Bank headquarters in the City of London, designed by Sir Edwin Lutyens.
 Federal Reserve Bank of New York Building on Manhattan, designed by York and Sawyer.
 American Radiator Building on Manhattan, designed by John Mead Howells, Raymond Hood and J. André Fouilhoux.
 Queen Mary's Dolls' House in England, designed by Sir Edwin Lutyens.
 Church Rate Corner (private house) in Cambridge, England designed by Baillie Scott.

Awards
 Olympic silver medal – Alfréd Hajós & Dezso Lauber of Hungary for Plan for Budapest Swimming Stadium.
 Olympic bronze medal – Julien Médecin of Monaco for Stadium for Monte Carlo (no gold medal was awarded).
 Grand Prix de Rome, architecture: Marcel Péchin.

Births

February 29 – Agustín Hernández Navarro, Mexican architect and sculptor (died 2022)
March 23 – John Madin, English architect (died 2012)
June 14 – Arthur Erickson, Canadian architect (died 2009)
August 14 – Sverre Fehn, award-winning Norwegian architect (died 2009)
August 16 – Philip Dowson, South African-born British architect (died 2014)
December 4 – John C. Portman Jr., American architect and developer

Deaths
April 14 – Louis Sullivan, American architect sometimes called the "father of skyscrapers" and "father of modernism"  (born 1856)
April 23 – Bertram Goodhue, American neo-gothic architect (born 1869)
April 24 – Ferdinand Arnodin, French bridge engineer (born 1845)
August 11 – Franz Heinrich Schwechten, German architect (born 1841)
November 7 – Sir Thomas Graham Jackson, English architect active in Oxford (born 1835)

References